Alexander or Alex Bain may refer to:

Alexander Bain (philosopher) (1818–1903), Scottish philosopher.
Alexander Bain (inventor) (1810–1877), Scottish inventor and engineer
Alex Bain (footballer) (Alexander Edward Bain, 1936–2014), British footballer
Alex Bain (actor) (Alexander Anthony Keith Bain, born 2001), Coronation Street actor

See also
Alexander Bayne (died 1737), first tenant of the chair of Scots law at the University of Edinburgh

Bain (surname)